"Deine Zärtlichkeit" is the debut German single of Soviet singer-songwriter Sofia Rotaru, which was released in 1978 by Ariola / Sony BMG Music Entertainment. It does not appear on the planned German debut studio album Sofia Rotaru. The single consists of two songs. Two more songs for the planned studio album with Sony BMG were recorded, but were not released either in this single, or in the planned studio album.

Song history
The single is Sofia Rotaru's very first commercially available single on the Western market.

Track listing

Side A

Side B

References 

Dance-pop songs
1978 debut singles
Sofia Rotaru songs
Songs with lyrics by Michael Kunze
1978 songs
Ariola Records singles
Sony BMG singles